The Hobbit, or There and Back Again is a children's fantasy novel by English author J. R. R. Tolkien. It was published in 1937 to wide critical acclaim, being nominated for the Carnegie Medal and awarded a prize from the New York Herald Tribune for best juvenile fiction. The book is recognized as a classic in children's literature, and is one of the best-selling books of all time with over 100 million copies sold.

The Hobbit is set within Tolkien's fictional universe and follows the quest of home-loving Bilbo Baggins, the titular hobbit, to win a share of the treasure guarded by a dragon named Smaug. Bilbo's journey takes him from his light-hearted, rural surroundings into more sinister territory.

The story is told in the form of an episodic quest, and most chapters introduce a specific creature or type of creature of Tolkien's geography. Bilbo gains a new level of maturity, competence, and wisdom by accepting the disreputable, romantic, fey, and adventurous sides of his nature and applying his wits and common sense. The story reaches its climax in the Battle of Five Armies, where many of the characters and creatures from earlier chapters re-emerge to engage in conflict.

Personal growth and forms of heroism are central themes of the story, along with motifs of warfare. These themes have led critics to view Tolkien's own experiences during World War I as instrumental in shaping the story. The author's scholarly knowledge of Germanic philology and interest in mythology and fairy tales are often noted as influences.

The publisher was encouraged by the book's critical and financial success and, therefore, requested a sequel. As Tolkien's work progressed on its successor, The Lord of the Rings, he made retrospective accommodations for it in The Hobbit. These few but significant changes were integrated into the second edition. Further editions followed with minor emendations, including those reflecting Tolkien's changing concept of the world into which Bilbo stumbled.

The work has never been out of print. Its ongoing legacy encompasses many adaptations for stage, screen, radio, board games, and video games. Several of these adaptations have received critical recognition on their own merits.

Characters

Bilbo Baggins, the protagonist, is a respectable, reserved hobbit—a race resembling short humans with furry, leathery feet who live in underground houses and are mainly pastoral farmers and gardeners. During his adventure, Bilbo often refers to the contents of his larder at home and wishes he had more food. Until he finds a magic ring, he is more baggage than help. Gandalf, an itinerant wizard, introduces Bilbo to a company of thirteen dwarves. During the journey, the wizard disappears on side errands dimly hinted at, only to appear again at key moments in the story. Thorin Oakenshield, the proud, pompous head of the company of dwarves and heir to the destroyed dwarvish kingdom under the Lonely Mountain, makes many mistakes in his leadership, relying on Gandalf and Bilbo to get him out of trouble, but proves himself a mighty warrior. Smaug is a dragon who long ago pillaged the dwarvish kingdom of Thorin's grandfather and sleeps upon the vast treasure.

The plot involves a host of other characters of varying importance, such as the twelve other dwarves of the company; two types of elves: both puckish and more serious warrior types; Men; man-eating trolls; boulder-throwing giants; evil cave-dwelling goblins; forest-dwelling giant spiders who can speak; immense and heroic eagles who also speak; evil wolves, or Wargs, who are allied with the goblins; Elrond the sage; Gollum, a strange creature inhabiting an underground lake; Beorn, a man who can assume bear form; and Bard the Bowman, a grim but honourable archer of Lake-town.

Plot

Gandalf tricks Bilbo Baggins into hosting a party for Thorin Oakenshield and his band of twelve dwarves (Dwalin, Balin, Kili, Fili, Dori, Nori, Ori, Oin, Gloin, Bifur, Bofur, and Bombur), who sing of reclaiming their ancient home, Lonely Mountain, and its vast treasure from the dragon Smaug. When the music ends, Gandalf unveils Thrór's map showing a secret door into the Mountain and proposes that the dumbfounded Bilbo serve as the expedition's "burglar". The dwarves ridicule the idea, but Bilbo, indignant, joins despite himself.

The group travels into the wild. Gandalf saves the company from trolls and leads them to Rivendell, where Elrond reveals more secrets from the map. When they attempt to cross the Misty Mountains, they are caught by goblins and driven deep underground. Although Gandalf rescues them, Bilbo gets separated from the others as they flee the goblins. Lost in the goblin tunnels, he stumbles across a mysterious ring and then encounters Gollum, who engages him in a game, each posing a riddle until one of them cannot solve it. If Bilbo wins, Gollum will show him the way out of the tunnels, but if he fails, his life will be forfeit. With the help of the ring, which confers invisibility, Bilbo escapes and rejoins the dwarves, improving his reputation with them. The goblins and Wargs give chase, but the company are saved by eagles. They rest in the house of Beorn.

The company enters the dark forest of Mirkwood without Gandalf, who has other responsibilities. In Mirkwood, Bilbo first saves the dwarves from giant spiders and then from the dungeons of the Wood-elves. Nearing the Lonely Mountain, the travellers are welcomed by the human inhabitants of Lake-town, who hope the dwarves will fulfil prophecies of Smaug's demise. The expedition reaches the mountain and finds the secret door. The dwarves send a reluctant Bilbo inside to scout the dragon's lair. He steals a great cup and, while conversing with Smaug, spots a gap in the ancient dragon's armour. The enraged dragon, deducing that Lake-town has aided the intruders, flies off to destroy the town. A thrush overhears Bilbo's report of Smaug's vulnerability and tells Lake-town resident Bard. Smaug wreaks havoc on the town, until Bard fires an arrow into Smaug's hollow spot, killing the dragon.

When the dwarves take possession of the mountain, Bilbo finds the Arkenstone, the most-treasured heirloom of Thorin's family, and hides it away. The Wood-elves and Lake-men request compensation for Lake-town's destruction and settlement of old claims on the treasure. When Thorin refuses to give them anything, they besiege the mountain. However, Thorin manages to send a message to his kinfolk in the Iron Hills and reinforces his position. Bilbo slips out and gives the Arkenstone to the besiegers, hoping to head off a war. When they offer the jewel to Thorin in exchange for treasure, Bilbo reveals how they obtained it. Thorin, furious at what he sees as betrayal, banishes Bilbo, and battle seems inevitable when Dáin Ironfoot, Thorin's second cousin, arrives with an army of dwarf warriors.

Gandalf reappears to warn all of an approaching army of goblins and Wargs. The dwarves, men and elves band together, but only with the timely arrival of the eagles and Beorn do they win the climactic Battle of Five Armies. Thorin is fatally wounded and reconciles with Bilbo before he dies.

Bilbo accepts only a small portion of his share of the treasure, having no want or need for more, but still returns home a very wealthy hobbit roughly a year and a month after he first left. Years later, he writes the story of his adventures.

Concept and creation

Background

In the early 1930s Tolkien was pursuing an academic career at Oxford as Rawlinson and Bosworth Professor of Anglo-Saxon, with a fellowship at Pembroke College. Several of his poems had been published in magazines and small collections, including Goblin Feet and The Cat and the Fiddle: A Nursery Rhyme Undone and its Scandalous Secret Unlocked, a reworking of the nursery rhyme Hey Diddle Diddle. His creative endeavours at this time also included letters from Father Christmas to his children—illustrated manuscripts that featured warring gnomes and goblins, and a helpful polar bear—alongside the creation of elven languages and an attendant mythology, including the Book of Lost Tales, which he had been creating since 1917. These works all saw posthumous publication.

In a 1955 letter to W. H. Auden, Tolkien recollects that he began work on The Hobbit one day early in the 1930s, when he was marking School Certificate papers. He found a blank page. Suddenly inspired, he wrote the words, "In a hole in the ground there lived a hobbit." By late 1932 he had finished the story and then lent the manuscript to several friends, including C. S. Lewis and a student of Tolkien's named Elaine Griffiths. In 1936, when Griffiths was visited in Oxford by Susan Dagnall, a staff member of the publisher George Allen & Unwin, she is reported to have either lent Dagnall the book or suggested she borrow it from Tolkien. In any event, Dagnall was impressed by it, and showed the book to Stanley Unwin, who then asked his 10-year-old son Rayner to review it. Rayner's favourable comments settled Allen & Unwin's decision to publish Tolkien's book.

Setting

The setting of The Hobbit, as described on its original dust jacket, is "ancient time between the age of Faerie and the dominion of men" in an unnamed fantasy world. The world is shown on the endpaper map as "Western Lands" westward and "Wilderland" as the east. Originally this world was self-contained, but as Tolkien began work on The Lord of the Rings, he decided these stories could fit into the legendarium he had been working on privately for decades. The Hobbit and The Lord of the Rings became the end of the "Third Age" of Middle Earth within Arda. Eventually those tales of the earlier periods became published as The Silmarillion and other posthumous works.

Influences
One of the greatest influences on Tolkien was the 19th-century Arts and Crafts polymath William Morris. Tolkien wished to imitate Morris's prose and poetry romances, following the general style and approach of the work. The Desolation of Smaug as portraying dragons as detrimental to landscape, has been noted as an explicit motif borrowed from Morris. Tolkien wrote also of being impressed as a boy by Samuel Rutherford Crockett's historical novel The Black Douglas and of basing the Necromancer—Sauron—on its villain, Gilles de Retz. Incidents in both The Hobbit and Lord of the Rings are similar in narrative and style to the novel, and its overall style and imagery have been suggested as having had an influence on Tolkien.

Tolkien's portrayal of goblins in The Hobbit was particularly influenced by George MacDonald's The Princess and the Goblin. However, MacDonald's influence on Tolkien was more profound than the shaping of individual characters and episodes; his works further helped Tolkien form his whole thinking on the role of fantasy within his Christian faith.

The Tolkien scholar Mark T. Hooker has catalogued a lengthy series of parallels between The Hobbit and Jules Verne's 1864 Journey to the Center of the Earth. These include, among other things, a hidden runic message and a celestial alignment that direct the adventurers to the goals of their quests.

Tolkien's works show many influences from Norse mythology, reflecting his lifelong passion for those stories and his academic interest in Germanic philology. The Hobbit is no exception to this; the work shows influences from northern European literature, myths and languages, especially from the Poetic Edda and the Prose Edda. Examples include the names of characters, such as Fili, Kili, Oin, Gloin, Bifur, Bofur, Bombur, Dori, Nori, Dwalin, Balin, Dain, Nain, Thorin Oakenshield and Gandalf (deriving from the Old Norse names Fíli, Kíli, Oin, Glói, Bivör, Bávörr, Bömburr, Dori, Nóri, Dvalinn, Bláin, Dain, Nain, Þorin Eikinskialdi and Gandálfr). But while their names are from Old Norse, the characters of the dwarves are more directly taken from fairy tales such as Snow White and Snow-White and Rose-Red as collected by the Brothers Grimm. The latter tale may also have influenced the character of Beorn.

Tolkien's use of descriptive names such as Misty Mountains and Bag End echoes the names used in Old Norse sagas. The names of the dwarf-friendly ravens, such as Roäc, are derived from the Old Norse words for "raven" and "rook", but their peaceful characters are unlike the typical carrion birds from Old Norse and Old English literature. Tolkien is not simply skimming historical sources for effect: the juxtaposition of old and new styles of expression is seen by the Tolkien scholar Tom Shippey as one of the major themes explored in The Hobbit. Maps figure in both saga literature and The Hobbit. Several of the author's illustrations incorporate Anglo-Saxon runes, an English adaptation of the Germanic runic alphabets.

Themes from Old English literature, and specifically from Beowulf, shape the ancient world which Bilbo stepped into. Tolkien, a scholar of Beowulf, counted the epic among his "most valued sources" for The Hobbit. Tolkien was one of the first critics to treat Beowulf as a literary work with value beyond the merely historical, with his 1936 lecture Beowulf: the Monsters and the Critics. Tolkien borrowed several elements from Beowulf, including a monstrous, intelligent dragon. Certain descriptions in The Hobbit seem to have been lifted straight out of Beowulf with some minor rewording, such as when the dragon stretches its neck out to sniff for intruders. Likewise, Tolkien's descriptions of the lair as accessed through a secret passage mirror those in Beowulf. Other specific plot elements and features in The Hobbit that show similarities to Beowulf include the title of thief, as Bilbo is called by Gollum and later by Smaug, and Smaug's personality, which leads to the destruction of Lake-town. Tolkien refines parts of Beowulf plot that he appears to have found less than satisfactorily described, such as details about the cup-thief and the dragon's intellect and personality.

Another influence from Old English sources is the appearance of named blades of renown, adorned with runes. In using his elf-blade Bilbo finally takes his first independent heroic action. By his naming the blade "Sting" we see Bilbo's acceptance of the kinds of cultural and linguistic practices found in Beowulf, signifying his entrance into the ancient world in which he found himself. This progression culminates in Bilbo stealing a cup from the dragon's hoard, rousing him to wrath—an incident directly mirroring Beowulf and an action entirely determined by traditional narrative patterns. As Tolkien wrote, "The episode of the theft arose naturally (and almost inevitably) from the circumstances. It is difficult to think of any other way of conducting the story at this point. I fancy the author of Beowulf would say much the same." The name of the wizard Radagast is taken from the name of the Slavic deity Radogost.

The representation of the dwarves in The Hobbit was influenced by his own selective reading of medieval texts regarding the Jewish people and their history. The dwarves' characteristics of being dispossessed of their ancient homeland at the Lonely Mountain, and living among other groups whilst retaining their own culture are all derived from the medieval image of Jews, whilst their warlike nature stems from accounts in the Hebrew Bible. The Dwarvish calendar invented for The Hobbit reflects the Jewish calendar which begins in late autumn. And although Tolkien denied that he used allegory, the dwarves taking Bilbo out of his complacent existence has been seen as an eloquent metaphor for the "impoverishment of Western society without Jews."

Publication

George Allen & Unwin published the first edition of The Hobbit on 21 September 1937 with a print run of 1,500 copies, which sold out by December because of enthusiastic reviews. This first printing was illustrated in black and white by Tolkien, who designed the dust jacket as well. Houghton Mifflin of Boston and New York reset type for an American edition, to be released early in 1938, in which four of the illustrations would be colour plates. Allen & Unwin decided to incorporate the colour illustrations into their second printing, released at the end of 1937. Despite the book's popularity, paper rationing due to World War II and not ending until 1949 meant that the Allen & Unwin edition of the book was often unavailable during this period.

Subsequent editions in English were published in 1951, 1966, 1978 and 1995. Numerous English-language editions of The Hobbit have been produced by several publishers, making it one of the best-selling books of all time with over 100 million copies sold by 2012. In addition, The Hobbit has been translated into over sixty languages, with more than one published version for some languages.

Revisions

In December 1937 The Hobbit publisher, Stanley Unwin, asked Tolkien for a sequel. In response Tolkien provided drafts for The Silmarillion, but the editors rejected them, believing that the public wanted "more about hobbits". Tolkien subsequently began work on The New Hobbit, which would eventually become The Lord of the Rings, a course that would not only change the context of the original story, but lead to substantial changes to the character of Gollum.

In the first edition of The Hobbit, Gollum willingly bets his magic ring on the outcome of the riddle-game, and he and Bilbo part amicably. In the second edition edits, to reflect the new concept of the One Ring and its corrupting abilities, Tolkien made Gollum more aggressive towards Bilbo and distraught at losing the ring. The encounter ends with Gollum's curse, "Thief! Thief, Thief, Baggins! We hates it, we hates it, we hates it forever!" This presages Gollum's portrayal in The Lord of the Rings.

Tolkien sent this revised version of the chapter "Riddles in the Dark" to Unwin as an example of the kinds of changes needed to bring the book into conformity with The Lord of the Rings, but he heard nothing back for years. When he was sent galley proofs of a new edition, Tolkien was surprised to find the sample text had been incorporated. In The Lord of the Rings, the original version of the riddle game is explained as a lie made up by Bilbo under the harmful influence of the Ring, whereas the revised version contains the "true" account. The revised text became the second edition, published in 1951 in both the UK and the US.

Tolkien began a new version in 1960, attempting to adjust the tone of The Hobbit to its sequel. He abandoned the new revision at chapter three after he received criticism that it "just wasn't The Hobbit, implying it had lost much of its light-hearted tone and quick pace.

After an unauthorized paperback edition of The Lord of the Rings appeared from Ace Books in 1965, Houghton Mifflin and Ballantine asked Tolkien to refresh the text of The Hobbit to renew the US copyright. This text became the 1966 third edition. Tolkien took the opportunity to align the narrative even more closely to The Lord of the Rings and to cosmological developments from his still unpublished Quenta Silmarillion as it stood at that time. These small edits included, for example, changing the phrase "elves that are now called Gnomes" from the first, and second editions, on page 63, to "High Elves of the West, my kin" in the third edition. Tolkien had used "gnome" in his earlier writing to refer to the second kindred of the High Elves—the Noldor (or "Deep Elves")—thinking that "gnome", derived from the Greek gnosis (knowledge), was a good name for the wisest of the elves. However, because of its common denotation of a garden gnome, derived from the 16th-century Paracelsus, Tolkien abandoned the term. He also changed "tomatoes" to "pickles" but retained other anachronisms, such as clocks and tobacco. In The Lord of the Rings, he has Merry explain that tobacco had been brought from the West by the Númenóreans.

Posthumous critical editions

Since the author's death, two critical editions of The Hobbit have been published, providing commentary on the creation, emendation and development of the text. In The Annotated Hobbit, Douglas Anderson provides the text of the published book alongside commentary and illustrations. Later editions added the text of "The Quest of Erebor". Anderson's commentary makes note of the sources Tolkien brought together in preparing the text, and chronicles the changes Tolkien made to the published editions. The text is also accompanied by illustrations from foreign language editions, among them work by Tove Jansson.

With The History of The Hobbit, published in two parts in 2007, John D. Rateliff provides the full text of the earliest and intermediary drafts of the book, alongside commentary that shows relationships to Tolkien's scholarly and creative works, both contemporary and later. Rateliff provides the abandoned 1960s retelling and previously unpublished illustrations by Tolkien. The book separates commentary from Tolkien's text, allowing the reader to read the original drafts as self-contained stories.

Illustration and design

Tolkien's correspondence and publisher's records show that he was involved in the design and illustration of the entire book. All elements were the subject of considerable correspondence and fussing over by Tolkien. Rayner Unwin, in his publishing memoir, comments: "In 1937 alone Tolkien wrote 26 letters to George Allen & Unwin... detailed, fluent, often pungent, but infinitely polite and exasperatingly precise... I doubt any author today, however famous, would get such scrupulous attention."

Even the maps, of which Tolkien originally proposed five, were considered and debated. He wished Thror's Map to be tipped in (that is, glued in after the book has been bound) at first mention in the text, and with the moon letter Cirth on the reverse so they could be seen when held up to the light. In the end the cost, as well as the shading of the maps, which would be difficult to reproduce, resulted in the final design of two maps as endpapers, Thror's map, and the Map of Wilderland (see Rhovanion), both printed in black and red on the paper's cream background.

Originally Allen & Unwin planned to illustrate the book only with the endpaper maps, but Tolkien's first tendered sketches so charmed the publisher's staff that they opted to include them without raising the book's price despite the extra cost. Thus encouraged, Tolkien supplied a second batch of illustrations. The publisher accepted all of these as well, giving the first edition ten black-and-white illustrations plus the two endpaper maps. The illustrated scenes were: The Hill: Hobbiton-across-the-Water, The Trolls, The Mountain Path, The Misty Mountains looking West from the Eyrie towards Goblin Gate, Beorn's Hall, Mirkwood, The Elvenking's Gate, Lake Town, The Front Gate, and The Hall at Bag-End. All but one of the illustrations were a full page, and one, the Mirkwood illustration, required a separate plate.

Satisfied with his skills, the publishers asked Tolkien to design a dust jacket. This project, too, became the subject of many iterations and much correspondence, with Tolkien always writing disparagingly of his own ability to draw. The runic inscription around the edges of the illustration are a phonetic transliteration of English, giving the title of the book and details of the author and publisher. The original jacket design contained several shades of various colours, but Tolkien redrew it several times using fewer colours each time. His final design consisted of four colours. The publishers, mindful of the cost, removed the red from the sun to end up with only black, blue, and green ink on white stock.

The publisher's production staff designed a binding, but Tolkien objected to several elements. Through several iterations, the final design ended up as mostly the author's. The spine shows runes: two "þ" (Thráin and Thrór) runes and one "d" (door). The front and back covers were mirror images of each other, with an elongated dragon characteristic of Tolkien's style stamped along the lower edge, and with a sketch of the Misty Mountains stamped along the upper edge.

Once illustrations were approved for the book, Tolkien proposed colour plates as well. The publisher would not relent on this, so Tolkien pinned his hopes on the American edition to be published about six months later. Houghton Mifflin rewarded these hopes with the replacement of the frontispiece (The Hill: Hobbiton-across-the Water) in colour and the addition of new colour plates: Rivendell, Bilbo Woke Up with the Early Sun in His Eyes, Bilbo comes to the Huts of the Raft-elves and Conversation with Smaug, which features a dwarvish curse written in Tolkien's invented script Tengwar, and signed with two "þ" ("Th") runes. The additional illustrations proved so appealing that George Allen & Unwin adopted the colour plates as well for their second printing, with exception of Bilbo Woke Up with the Early Sun in His Eyes.

Different editions have been illustrated in diverse ways. Many follow the original scheme at least loosely, but many others are illustrated by other artists, especially the many translated editions. Some cheaper editions, particularly paperback, are not illustrated except with the maps. "The Children's Book Club" edition of 1942 includes the black-and-white pictures but no maps, an anomaly.

Tolkien's use of runes, both as decorative devices and as magical signs within the story, has been cited as a major cause for the popularization of runes within "New Age" and esoteric literature, stemming from Tolkien's popularity with the elements of counter-culture in the 1970s.

Genre

The Hobbit takes cues from narrative models of children's literature, as shown by its omniscient narrator and characters that young children can relate to, such as the small, food-obsessed, and morally ambiguous Bilbo. The text emphasizes the relationship between time and narrative progress and it openly distinguishes "safe" from "dangerous" in its geography. Both are key elements of works intended for children, as is the "home-away-home" (or there and back again) plot structure typical of the Bildungsroman. While Tolkien later claimed to dislike the aspect of the narrative voice addressing the reader directly, the narrative voice contributes significantly to the success of the novel. Emer O'Sullivan, in her Comparative Children's Literature, notes The Hobbit as one of a handful of children's books that have been accepted into mainstream literature, alongside Jostein Gaarder's Sophie's World (1991) and J. K. Rowling's Harry Potter series (1997–2007).

Tolkien intended The Hobbit as a "fairy-story" and wrote it in a tone suited to addressing children although he said later that the book was not specifically written for children but had rather been created out of his interest in mythology and legend. Many of the initial reviews refer to the work as a fairy story. However, according to Jack Zipes writing in The Oxford Companion to Fairy Tales, Bilbo is an atypical character for a fairy tale. The work is much longer than Tolkien's ideal proposed in his essay On Fairy-Stories. Many fairy tale motifs, such as the repetition of similar events seen in the dwarves' arrival at Bilbo's and Beorn's homes, and folklore themes, such as trolls turning to stone, are to be found in the story.

The book is popularly called (and often marketed as) a fantasy novel, but like Peter Pan and Wendy by J. M. Barrie and The Princess and the Goblin by George MacDonald, both of which influenced Tolkien and contain fantasy elements, it is primarily identified as being children's literature. The two genres are not mutually exclusive, so some definitions of high fantasy include works for children by authors such as L. Frank Baum and Lloyd Alexander alongside the works of Gene Wolfe and Jonathan Swift, which are more often considered adult literature. The Hobbit has been called "the most popular of all twentieth-century fantasies written for children". Jane Chance, however, considers the book to be a children's novel only in the sense that it appeals to the child in an adult reader. Sullivan credits the first publication of The Hobbit as an important step in the development of high fantasy, and further credits the 1960s paperback debuts of The Hobbit and The Lord of the Rings as essential to the creation of a mass market for fiction of this kind as well as the fantasy genre's current status.

Style

Tolkien's prose is unpretentious and straightforward, taking as given the existence of his imaginary world and describing its details in a matter-of-fact way, while often introducing the new and fantastic in an almost casual manner. This down-to-earth style, also found in later fantasy such as Richard Adams' Watership Down and Peter Beagle's The Last Unicorn, accepts readers into the fictional world, rather than cajoling or attempting to convince them of its reality. While The Hobbit is written in a simple, friendly language, each of its characters has a unique voice. The narrator, who occasionally interrupts the narrative flow with asides (a device common to both children's and Anglo-Saxon literature), has his own linguistic style separate from those of the main characters.

The basic form of the story is that of a quest, told in episodes. For the most part of the book, each chapter introduces a different denizen of the Wilderland, some helpful and friendly towards the protagonists, and others threatening or dangerous. However the general tone is kept light-hearted, being interspersed with songs and humour. One example of the use of song to maintain tone is when Thorin and Company are kidnapped by goblins, who, when marching them into the underworld, sing:

This onomatopoeic singing undercuts the dangerous scene with a sense of humour. Tolkien achieves balance of humour and danger through other means as well, as seen in the foolishness and Cockney dialect of the trolls and in the drunkenness of the elven captors. The general form—that of a journey into strange lands, told in a light-hearted mood and interspersed with songs—may be following the model of The Icelandic Journals by William Morris, an important literary influence on Tolkien.

Critical analysis

Themes

The evolution and maturation of the protagonist, Bilbo Baggins, is central to the story. This journey of maturation, where Bilbo gains a clear sense of identity and confidence in the outside world, may be seen in psychological terms as a Bildungsroman rather than a traditional quest. The Jungian concept of individuation is also reflected through this theme of growing maturity and capability, with the author contrasting Bilbo's personal growth against the arrested development of the dwarves. Thus, while Gandalf exerts a parental influence over Bilbo early on, it is Bilbo who gradually takes over leadership of the party, a fact the dwarves could not bear to acknowledge. The analogue of the "underworld" and the hero returning from it with a boon (such as the ring, or Elvish blades) that benefits his society is seen to fit the mythic archetypes regarding initiation and male coming-of-age as described by Joseph Campbell. 
Chance compares the development and growth of Bilbo against other characters to the concepts of just kingship versus sinful kingship derived from the Ancrene Wisse (which Tolkien had written on in 1929), and a Christian understanding of Beowulf, a text that influenced Tolkien's writing. Shippey comments that Bilbo is nothing like a king, and that Chance's talk of "types" just muddies the waters, though he agrees with her that there are "self-images of Tolkien" throughout his fiction; and she is right, too, in seeing Middle-earth as a balance between creativity and scholarship, "Germanic past and Christian present".

The overcoming of greed and selfishness has been seen as the central moral of the story. Whilst greed is a recurring theme in the novel, with many of the episodes stemming from one or more of the characters' simple desire for food (be it trolls eating dwarves or dwarves eating Wood-elf fare) or a desire for beautiful objects, such as gold and jewels, it is only by the Arkenstone's influence upon Thorin that greed, and its attendant vices "coveting" and "malignancy", come fully to the fore in the story and provide the moral crux of the tale. Bilbo steals the Arkenstone—a most ancient relic of the dwarves—and attempts to ransom it to Thorin for peace. However, Thorin turns on the Hobbit as a traitor, disregarding all the promises and "at your services" he had previously bestowed. In the end Bilbo gives up the precious stone and most of his share of the treasure to help those in greater need. Tolkien also explores the motif of jewels that inspire intense greed that corrupts those who covet them in the Silmarillion, and there are connections between the words "Arkenstone" and "Silmaril" in Tolkien's invented etymologies.

The Hobbit employs themes of animism. An important concept in anthropology and child development, animism is the idea that all things—including inanimate objects and natural events, such as storms or purses, as well as living things like animals and plants—possess human-like intelligence. John D. Rateliff calls this the "Doctor Dolittle Theme" in The History of the Hobbit, and cites the multitude of talking animals as indicative of this theme. These talking creatures include ravens, a thrush, spiders and the dragon Smaug, alongside the anthropomorphic goblins and elves. Patrick Curry notes that animism is also found in Tolkien's other works, and mentions the "roots of mountains" and "feet of trees" in The Hobbit as a linguistic shifting in level from the inanimate to animate. Tolkien saw the idea of animism as closely linked to the emergence of human language and myth: "...The first men to talk of 'trees and stars' saw things very differently. To them, the world was alive with mythological beings... To them the whole of creation was 'myth-woven and elf-patterned'."

Interpretation

As in plot and setting, Tolkien brings his literary theories to bear in forming characters and their interactions. He portrays Bilbo as a modern anachronism exploring an essentially antique world. Bilbo is able to negotiate and interact within this antique world because language and tradition make connections between the two worlds. For example, Gollum's riddles are taken from old historical sources, while those of Bilbo come from modern nursery books. It is the form of the riddle game, familiar to both, which allows Gollum and Bilbo to engage each other, rather than the content of the riddles themselves. This idea of a superficial contrast between characters' individual linguistic style, tone and sphere of interest, leading to an understanding of the deeper unity between the ancient and modern, is a recurring theme in The Hobbit.

Smaug is the main antagonist. In many ways the Smaug episode reflects and references the dragon of Beowulf, and Tolkien uses the episode to put into practice some of the ground-breaking literary theories he had developed about the Old English poem in its portrayal of the dragon as having bestial intelligence. Tolkien greatly prefers this motif over the later medieval trend of using the dragon as a symbolic or allegorical figure, such as in the legend of St. George. Smaug the dragon with his golden hoard may be seen as an example of the traditional relationship between evil and metallurgy as collated in the depiction of Pandæmonium with its "Belched fire and rolling smoke" in John Milton's Paradise Lost. Of all the characters, Smaug's speech is the most modern, using idioms such as "Don't let your imagination run away with you!"

Just as Tolkien's literary theories have been seen to influence the tale, so have Tolkien's experiences. The Hobbit may be read as Tolkien's parable of World War I with the hero being plucked from his rural home and thrown into a far-off war where traditional types of heroism are shown to be futile. The tale as such explores the theme of heroism. As Janet Brennan Croft notes, Tolkien's literary reaction to war at this time differed from most post-war writers by eschewing irony as a method for distancing events and instead using mythology to mediate his experiences. Similarities to the works of other writers who faced the Great War are seen in The Hobbit, including portraying warfare as anti-pastoral: in "The Desolation of Smaug", both the area under the influence of Smaug before his demise and the setting for the Battle of Five Armies later are described as barren, damaged landscapes. The Hobbit makes a warning against repeating the tragedies of World War I, and Tolkien's attitude as a veteran may well be summed up by Bilbo's comment: "Victory after all, I suppose! Well, it seems a very gloomy business."

Reception

On first publication in October 1937, The Hobbit was met with almost unanimously favourable reviews from publications both in the UK and the US, including The Times, Catholic World and New York Post. C. S. Lewis, friend of Tolkien (and later author of The Chronicles of Narnia between 1949 and 1954), writing in The Times reports:

The truth is that in this book a number of good things, never before united, have come together: a fund of humour, an understanding of children, and a happy fusion of the scholar's with the poet's grasp of mythology... The professor has the air of inventing nothing. He has studied trolls and dragons at first hand and describes them with that fidelity that is worth oceans of glib "originality."

Lewis compares the book to Alice in Wonderland in that both children and adults may find different things to enjoy in it, and places it alongside Flatland, Phantastes, and The Wind in the Willows. W. H. Auden, in his review of the sequel The Fellowship of the Ring, calls The Hobbit "one of the best children's stories of this century". Auden was later to correspond with Tolkien, and they became friends.

The Hobbit was nominated for the Carnegie Medal and awarded a prize from the New York Herald Tribune for best juvenile fiction of the year (1938). More recently, the book has been recognized as "Most Important 20th-Century Novel (for Older Readers)" in the Children's Books of the Century poll in Books for Keeps. In 2012 it was ranked number 14 on a list of the top 100 children's novels published by School Library Journal.

Publication of the sequel The Lord of the Rings altered many critics' reception of the work. Instead of approaching The Hobbit as a children's book in its own right, critics such as Randel Helms picked up on the idea of The Hobbit as being a "prelude", relegating the story to a dry-run for the later work. Countering a presentist interpretation are those who say this approach misses out on much of the original's value as a children's book and as a work of high fantasy in its own right, and that it disregards the book's influence on these genres. Commentators such as Paul Kocher, John D. Rateliff and C. W. Sullivan encourage readers to treat the works separately, both because The Hobbit was conceived, published, and received independently of the later work, and to avoid dashing readers' expectations of tone and style.

Legacy

The Lord of the Rings

While The Hobbit has been adapted and elaborated upon in many ways, its sequel The Lord of the Rings is often claimed to be its greatest legacy. The plots share the same basic structure progressing in the same sequence: the stories begin at Bag End, the home of Bilbo Baggins; Bilbo hosts a party that sets the novel's main plot into motion; Gandalf sends the protagonist into a quest eastward; Elrond offers a haven and advice; the adventurers escape dangerous creatures underground (Goblin Town/Moria); they engage another group of elves (Mirkwood/Lothlórien); they traverse a desolate region (Desolation of Smaug/the Dead Marshes); they are received and nourished by a small settlement of men (Esgaroth/Ithilien); they fight in a massive battle (The Battle of Five Armies/Battle of Pelennor Fields); their journey climaxes within an infamous mountain peak (Lonely Mountain/Mount Doom); a descendant of kings is restored to his ancestral throne (Bard/Aragorn); and the questing party returns home to find it in a deteriorated condition (having possessions auctioned off/the Scouring of the Shire).

The Lord of the Rings contains several more supporting scenes, and has a more sophisticated plot structure, following the paths of multiple characters. Tolkien wrote the later story in much less humorous tones and infused it with more complex moral and philosophical themes. The differences between the two stories can cause difficulties when readers, expecting them to be similar, find that they are not. Many of the thematic and stylistic differences arose because Tolkien wrote The Hobbit as a story for children, and The Lord of the Rings for the same audience, who had subsequently grown up since its publication. Further, Tolkien's concept of Middle-earth was to continually change and slowly evolve throughout his life and writings.

In education

The style and themes of the book have been seen to help stretch young readers' literacy skills, preparing them to approach the works of Dickens and Shakespeare. By contrast, offering advanced younger readers modern teenage-oriented fiction may not exercise their reading skills, while the material may contain themes more suited to adolescents. As one of several books that have been recommended for 11- to 14-year-old boys to encourage literacy in that demographic, The Hobbit is promoted as "the original and still the best fantasy ever written."

Several teaching guides and books of study notes have been published to help teachers and students gain the most from the book. The Hobbit introduces literary concepts, notably allegory, to young readers, as the work has been seen to have allegorical aspects reflecting the life and times of the author. Meanwhile, the author himself rejected an allegorical reading of his work. This tension can help introduce readers to "readerly" and "writerly" interpretations, to tenets of New Criticism, and critical tools from Freudian analysis, such as sublimation, in approaching literary works.

Another approach to critique taken in the classroom has been to propose the insignificance of female characters in the story as sexist. While Bilbo may be seen as a literary symbol of "small folk" of any gender, a gender-conscious approach can help students establish notions of a "socially symbolic text" where meaning is generated by tendentious readings of a given work. By this interpretation, it is ironic that the first authorized adaptation was a stage production in a girls' school.

Adaptations

The Hobbit has been adapted many times for a variety of media, starting with a March 1953 stage production by St. Margaret's School, Edinburgh. The first motion picture adaptation of The Hobbit was Gene Deitch's 1966 short film of cartoon stills.
In 1968, BBC Radio 4 broadcast an 8-part radio drama version by Michael Kilgarriff. In 1977, Rankin/Bass made an animated film based on the book. In 1978, Romeo Muller won a Peabody Award for his "execrable" and "confusing" teleplay. A children's opera composed by Dean Burry appeared in 2004 in Toronto.
Between 2012 and 2014, Peter Jackson's three-part live-action film version appeared on cinema screens.
Several computer and video games have been based on the story, including a 1982 game by Beam Software.
During the COVID-19 lockdown, Andy Serkis read the whole of The Hobbit to raise money for charity. He then recorded the work again as an audiobook, with cover art by Alan Lee.

Collectors' market

While reliable figures are difficult to obtain, estimated global sales of The Hobbit run between 35 and 100 million copies since 1937. In the UK The Hobbit has not retreated from the top 5,000 bestselling books measured by Nielsen BookScan since 1998, when the index began, achieving a three-year sales peak rising from 33,084 (2000) to 142,541 (2001), 126,771 (2002) and 61,229 (2003), ranking it at the 3rd position in Nielsen's "Evergreen" book list. The enduring popularity of The Hobbit makes early printings of the book attractive collectors' items. The first printing of the first English-language edition can sell for between £6,000 and £20,000 at auction, although the price for a signed first edition has reached over £60,000.

See also

 Middle-earth in film

References

Sources

 Primary
 
 
 
 
 

 Secondary

External links

 The official Harper-Collins Tolkien website
 Collection of edition covers, 1937–2007
 The Hobbit covers around the globe – gallery
 Every UK edition of The Hobbit
 Guide to U.S. editions of Tolkien books including The Hobbit
 1966 Gene Deitch 12 minute version of The Hobbit

 
1937 British novels
1937 children's books
1937 fantasy novels
Allen & Unwin books
BILBY Award-winning works
Novels about dragons
British adventure novels
British bildungsromans
British children's novels
British fantasy novels
Children's books adapted into films
Children's fantasy novels
High fantasy novels
Middle-earth books